Ellorum Nallavare is a 1975 Indian Tamil-language film, directed and produced by S. S. Balan. It is a remake of the 1974 Kannada film Bhootayyana Maga Ayyu. It was simultaneously produced in Telugu and Hindi languages as Andaroo Manchivare and Ek Gaon Ki Kahani. The trilingual was the last production of Gemini Studios; except for the Telugu version, it emerged a box-office bomb and led to the studio's collapse.

Plot 

The story line includes characters like a greedy moneylender and his repentant son, a good Samaritan, who is a victim of the unscrupulous moneylender, his son, the enmity that springs up, romance thrown in for good measure, the fury unleashed by a remorseless nature, and the terrible wages that evil earns.

Production 
Ellorum Nallavare was produced and directed by S. S. Balan. It was the final film produced under the Gemini Studios banner. It was a trilingual, produced in Tamil, Telugu and Hindi languages. The Telugu version was titled Andaroo Manchivare, and the Hindi version was titled Ek Gaon Ki Kahani. The film was entirely shot at Kalasapura village, they built house sets there specifically for the film.

Soundtrack 
The soundtrack was composed by V. Kumar.

Reception 
Ellorum Nallavare was a box-office bomb, and led to the collapse of Gemini Studios. Ek Gaon Ki Kahani too did not succeed, but the Telugu version did. Kanthan of Kalki appreciated the performances of the cast and crew particularly appreciating cinematography for the flood scene and concluded that the film's producer and director S. S. Balan reminds of S. S. Vasan and called it an exciting colour film.

References

Bibliography

External links 
 
 

1970s Hindi-language films
1970s Tamil-language films
1970s Telugu-language films
1975 films
Films scored by V. Kumar
Gemini Studios films
Hindi remakes of Kannada films
Indian multilingual films
Tamil remakes of Kannada films
Telugu remakes of Kannada films